Manju Devi Meghwal was a former minister of Ministry of Women and Child Development in Rajasthan government and MLA of Rajasthan Legislative Assembly for Jayal.

References

Indian National Congress politicians from Rajasthan
Living people
Rajasthan MLAs 2008–2013
Women in Rajasthan politics
21st-century Indian women politicians
21st-century Indian politicians
People from Nagaur district
1977 births
Rajasthan MLAs 2018–2023